Marco Pomante (born 13 July 1983) is an Italian footballer who plays for S.S.D. San Nicolò Calcio.

Career

Pescara
A youth product of Abruzzo team Pescara, Pomante was loaned to Fano in his early career. He returned to Pescara in 2004 and played a few Serie B matches. In January 2006 he left for Chieti. Despite took the no.2 shirt from Stefano Di Berardino at the start of 2006–07 Serie B season, he left for Giulianova in August 2006 and Ravenna in January 2007

After Pescara relegated to Serie C1, Pomante returned to Pescara and was a regular starter of the team. He signed a new 3-year contract in April 2008. But on 31 August 2009 he left for Andria BAT of the same group. Pescara promoted back to Serie B as the group A runner-up and Andria BAT just able to survive by winning the relegation play-off of group A.

In August 2010 he was loaned to Prima Divisione newcomer Nocerina. He wore no.83 shirt before left the team.

International
He played once for Italy under-21 Serie B representative team against Bosnia and Herzegovina U21, as right back. U21 Serie B won the eastern neighbor 3–2.

Honors
Ravenna
Lega Pro Prima Divisione (1): 2007

References

External links
 Football.it profile 
 
 
 

1983 births
Living people
Sportspeople from the Province of Teramo
Italian footballers
Serie B players
Serie C players
Serie D players
Association football central defenders
Delfino Pescara 1936 players
Alma Juventus Fano 1906 players
S.S. Chieti Calcio players
Giulianova Calcio players
Ravenna F.C. players
S.S. Fidelis Andria 1928 players
A.S.G. Nocerina players
A.S.D. Nocerina 1910 players
L'Aquila Calcio 1927 players
U.S. Viterbese 1908 players
Footballers from Abruzzo